is a
Japanese comedian, tarento, and presenter.

Filmography

TV series
Regular appearances

Quasi-regular appearances

Single-occasional appearances

Specials

Former appearances

Radio

TV series
Regular appearances

Guest appearances

Dramas

Films

Advertisements

Other

Internet series

DVD

CD

Voice acting

Stage

Live

References

External links
 

Japanese comedians
Japanese television presenters
1974 births
Living people
People from Hyōgo Prefecture